The 2015 VFF National Super League was the Vanuatu qualifying competition for the 2015–16 OFC Champions League and the 2017 OFC Champions League for clubs outside of Port Vila.

The team who qualified for the 2015–16 OFC Champions League is Amicale FC.
The team who qualified for the 2017 OFC Champions League is Malampa Revivors.

Teams

18 teams will qualify from 8 separate national competitions.

Matches

Group stage 
From Group A, Big Bay FC advanced in first place and Malampa Revivors advanced in second place.

From Group B, Blue Rovers FC advanced in first place and Vaum United FC advanced in second place.

From Group C, Ifira Black Bird F.C. advanced in first place and Amicale F.C. advanced in second place.

From Group D, Erakor Golden Star advanced in first place and LL Echo advanced in second place.

Playoffs

Quarter-finals

Semi-finals

Third-Place Match

Grand Final

References

2014–15 in Vanuatuan football
VFF National Super League seasons